Devin McEwan (born October 11, 1984) is an American slalom canoeist who has competed since 2001.

Together with Casey Eichfeld he won a gold medal at the 2015 Pan American Games and placed tenth in the slalom doubles (C2) event at the 2016 Summer Olympics in Rio de Janeiro. He is the son of Olympic slalom canoeist Jamie McEwan and artist Sandra Boynton.

References

External links

 
 
 Devin MCEWAN at CanoeSlalom.net

1984 births
Living people
Canoeists at the 2016 Summer Olympics
Olympic canoeists of the United States
American male canoeists
Pan American Games medalists in canoeing
Pan American Games gold medalists for the United States
Canoeists at the 2015 Pan American Games
Medalists at the 2015 Pan American Games